The 2022–23 season is the 124th season in the existence of Watford Football Club and the club's first season back in the Championship since the 2020–21 following their relegation from the Premier League last season. In addition to the league, they will also compete in the FA Cup and the EFL Cup.

Players

Current squad

Transfers

Transfers in

Transfers out

Loans in

Loans out

Pre-season and friendlies

On June 24, Watford announced their pre-season schedule, which included a training camp in Austria. A replacement fixture for the Austria traning camp was confirmed, against Panathinaikos.

Competitions

Overall record

Championship

League table

Results summary

Results by round

Matches

On 23 June, the league fixtures were announced.

FA Cup

The Hornets were drawn away to Reading in the third round.

EFL Cup

Watford entered in the second round and were drawn at home to Milton Keynes Dons.

Statistics

Appearances and goals

Goalscorers
As of 18 March 2023

Assists
As of 18 March 2023

Clean sheets

See also
 2022–23 in English football
 List of Watford F.C. seasons

References

External links

Watford F.C. seasons
Watford F.C.
English football clubs 2022–23 season